Perisesarma is a genus of mangrove crabs in the family Sesarmidae (or Grapsidae in some classifications) predominantly found in the Indo-Pacific. Some 23 species are described as of late 2006, with two from West Africa: P. kammermani (De Man, 1883) and P. alberti Rathbun, 1921. They are typically small, semiterrestrial crabs found on the forest floor at low tide. They eat nearly anything they can, and try to eat anything that does not threaten them — including pencils and other objects dropped on the forest floor. The last species of the genus described is P. samawati Gillikin and Schubart (2004). It can be found in East Africa along with P. guttatum, but its sister species is P. eumolpe from Malaysian mangroves

Species
Perisesarma samawati Gillikin and Schubart, 2004
Perisesarma bengalense Davie, 2003 
Perisesarma cricotus Rahayu and Davie, 2002
Perisesarma foresti Rahayu and Davie, 2002
Perisesarma maipoensis (Soh, 1978)
Perisesarma messa (Campbell, 1967)
Perisesarma brevicristatum (Campbell, 1967)
Perisesarma darwinensis (Campbell, 1967)
Perisesarma longicristatum (Campbell, 1967)
Perisesarma lanchesteri (Tweedie, 1936)
Perisesarma alberti Rathbun, 1921
Perisesarma indiarum (De Man, 1902)
Perisesarma fasciatum (Lanchester, 1900)
Perisesarma onychophorum (De Man, 1895)
Perisesarma eumolpe (De Man, 1895)
Perisesarma semperi (Bürger, 1893)
Perisesarma haswelli (De Man, 1887)
Perisesarma kammermani (De Man, 1883)
Perisesarma lividum (A. Milne Edwards, 1869)
Perisesarma guttatum (A. Milne Edwards, 1869)
Perisesarma dussumieri (H. Milne Edwards, 1853)
Perisesarma bidens (De Haan, 1835)
Perisesarma huzardi (Desmarest, 1825)

References

Grapsoidea
Taxa named by Johannes Govertus de Man